Heidi Renoth (born 22 February 1978) is a German snowboarder and Olympic medalist. She received a silver medal at the 1998 Winter Olympics in Nagano.

References

1978 births
Living people
German female snowboarders
Olympic snowboarders of Germany
Snowboarders at the 1998 Winter Olympics
Snowboarders at the 2002 Winter Olympics
Olympic silver medalists for Germany
Olympic medalists in snowboarding
Medalists at the 1998 Winter Olympics
20th-century German women
21st-century German women